This is a list of the Archbishops and Primates of the Anglican Church in North America. The Global Anglican Future Conference of 2008 called the Anglican Church in North America into being. After the Church was organized and constituted in 2009, the GAFCON Primates Council recognized the Anglican Church in North America as a Province of the Anglican Communion and invited Archbishop Robert Duncan to join the Primates Council. The leadership of the Anglican Global South has dealt with the reality of the Anglican Church in North America similarly, and the Anglican Church in North America a member.

The Anglican Church in North America has not been recognized as an Anglican Province by the Anglican Communion Office or officially by the Archbishop of Canterbury, though relations are cordial.

Table of Archbishops

Anglican Church in North America
United States
Episcopal
Presiding Bishops